KOOZ (94.1 FM) is a radio station licensed to Myrtle Point, Oregon. The station is owned by Southern Oregon University, and is an affiliate of Jefferson Public Radio, airing JPR's "Classics & News" service, consisting of news and classical music programming.

External links
ijpr.org

OOZ
Classical music radio stations in the United States
NPR member stations
Coos County, Oregon
Southern Oregon University
Radio stations established in 1998
1998 establishments in Oregon